Repertorio Americano was a cultural magazine published in San José, Costa Rica by Joaquín García Monge, on and off between 1919 and 1958. It was a significant forum of discussion for the Latin American intellectuals of the period. The editor considered the journalist to be a promoter of ideas and democratic ideals for the common good. In this way, Repertorio Americano built an international community that professed Americanism. Its ideological orientation exhibited republicanism, antifascism, and pacifism. "...she must be run to, not only to find the proper terms for a history of the culture of contemporary America, but also when one wants to underline the wisdom of our continent's great figures." The editor of the publication said, "The magazine is there so that the intellectual and elite generation of a country or a continent can express what they think and feel about the multiple facets of life. For this, there needs to be freedom, tolerance and the inevitable action and reaction to the concerns cited in the magazine."

References

Cultural magazines
Defunct magazines published in Costa Rica
Magazines published in Costa Rica
Magazines established in 1919
Magazines disestablished in 1958
Spanish-language magazines